Cartel Land is a 2015 American documentary film directed by Matthew Heineman about the Mexican Drug War, especially vigilante groups fighting Mexican drug cartels. The film focuses on Tim "Nailer" Foley, the leader of Arizona Border Recon, and Dr. José Mireles, a Michoacán-based physician who leads the Autodefensas. The film was nominated for the Academy Award for Best Documentary Feature in 2016.

Synopsis 
The film focuses on two vigilante groups who fight drug cartels from different sides of the United States–Mexico border.

In Mexico, the film focuses on José Manuel Mireles Valverde, known locally as "El Doctor". Mireles becomes fed up with the local Knights Templar Cartel. He gathers a group of citizens from the state of Michoacán and leads an uprising, driving the cartel out of the region.

In the US, the film follows an American veteran named Tim "Nailer" Foley, who is forming a small paramilitary group called the Arizona Border Recon. His goal is to stop the same Mexican cartel from conducting business in the US.

Production
Heineman got the idea for the film after reading about Arizona Border Recon in an article in Rolling Stone magazine, and then his father sent him a Wall Street Journal article about José Manuel Mireles and the Autodefensas. "The minute I read that article, I knew I wanted to create a parallel story of vigilantes on both sides of the border. I wanted to know what happens when government institutions fail and citizens feel like they have to take the law into their own hands."

The film was shot in Michoacán, southwest Mexico and in Arizona. Heineman was inspired by The Square in the making of the film.

Reception
Cartel Land received very positive reviews from critics. Review aggregator website Rotten Tomatoes reports an 90% rating based on 99 reviews, and an average rating of 7.60/10. The site's consensus states: "Raw, brutal, and bitter, Cartel Land offers a ground-level look at vigilante efforts to thwart organized crime at the Mexican–American border." On Metacritic, the film has a 76 out of 100 rating based on 25 critics, indicating "generally favorable reviews". Cartel Land appeared on over twenty critics' lists for best documentary and best film of 2015. It was listed as the #1 documentary of 2015 by Indiewire's The Playlist and by Paste Magazine, which also named Heineman as the best new filmmaker of the year. On December 1, the film was selected as one of 15 shortlisted for the Academy Award for Best Documentary Feature.

Heineman won the Best Director Award and Special Jury Award for Cinematography for the film in the U.S. Documentary Competition at the 2015 Sundance Film Festival, where the documentary premiered. He was presented the award for Outstanding Directorial Achievement in Documentary by the Directors Guild of America,  as well as the 2015 Courage Under Fire Award for the film by the International Documentary Association. The film was also nominated for Best Documentary at the 69th British Academy Film Awards  and for the Academy Award for Best Documentary Feature at the 88th Academy Awards. The film received the 2015 Documentary Film Award from the George Polk Awards in Journalism.

On February 12, 2015, Orchard Films acquired the rights to the film. Cartel Land was released theatrically in the summer of 2015 and aired on A&E on January 4, 2016.

Awards and nominations

See also
 Grupos de Autodefensa Comunitaria
 Narco Cultura

References

External links
 
 
 
 
 
 Arizona Border Recon website

2015 films
Primetime Emmy Award-winning broadcasts
2015 documentary films
American documentary films
Documentary films about the illegal drug trade
Films about Mexican drug cartels
Documentary films about Mexico
The Orchard (company) films
2010s English-language films
2010s American films
2010s Mexican films
Films directed by Matthew Heineman